Charles Carroll "Stretch" Murphy (April 10, 1907 – August 17, 1992) was an American basketball player.

He played competitive basketball at Marion High School (1922–26), located in Marion, Indiana. The All-State player led his school to the Indiana state championship in 1926 during his senior year. He was recruited by men's head coach, Ward Lambert, at Purdue University, where he played for four seasons (1926–1930). Scoring 137 points (11.4 ppg), he teamed with fellow Hall of Famer John Wooden and co-captain Glen Harmeson, to lead the Boilers to the Big 10 championship in 1930 after an undefeated season in conference play (10-0). He set a new Big 10 scoring record for a season in 1929 with 143 points (11.9 ppg) and led Purdue to a 53-13 overall record during his tenure. Murphy was named a Consensus All-American in both his junior and senior years and to the All-time All-American team. After graduating from Purdue, Murphy played for the American Basketball League's Chicago Bruins and the independent Indianapolis Kautskys.

Murphy was one of the game's first true big men. At 6'6" (1.98 m), he was an insurmountable force on both ends of the court. He was inducted into the Basketball Hall of Fame in 1960 and the Indiana Basketball Hall of Fame in 1963.

Murphy died on August 17, 1992 at age 85.

References

External links
Indiana Basketball Hall of Fame profile
Naismith Basketball Hall of Fame profile

1907 births
1992 deaths
All-American college men's basketball players
American men's basketball players
Basketball players from Indiana
Centers (basketball)
Chicago Bruins players
Indianapolis Kautskys players
Naismith Memorial Basketball Hall of Fame inductees
National Collegiate Basketball Hall of Fame inductees
People from Marion, Indiana
Purdue Boilermakers men's basketball players